This is a list of lighthouses in Ireland. The Commissioners of Irish Lights are responsible for the majority of marine navigation aids around the island though a small number are maintained by local harbour authorities.  The main list identifies those lighthouses in a clockwise direction starting with Crookhaven lighthouse, County Cork.

Maintained by Commissioners of Irish Lights

Maintained by other Irish marine authorities 

A smaller number of active lighthouses are operated by other authorities, primarily the port and harbour companies located around the Irish coast.

Inactive

Improvements and changes to the aids to navigation around the Irish coast, has meant that there are a number of lighthouses that have been decommissioned. This list includes those where the tower or structure is still in existence. Some of these have been reused, such as Ferris Point which is now a vessel control tower. Clare Island was turned into a guest house and the optic is on permanent rotating display at the World of Glass museum and visitor centre in North West England. The older Wicklow Head tower was refurbished by the Irish Landmark Trust as a holiday let.

Other
 Baltimore Beacon, Baltimore, County Cork

See also
 Lightvessel
 Lists of lighthouses
 List of islands of Ireland
 List of RNLI stations

References

External links
  Commissioners of Irish Lights map showing location of navigation aids maintained around the coast of Ireland (2014).
 lighthouses R Us
 Some 4,000 photographs of Irish lighthouses at Flickr
 

Ireland
 
Lighthouses
Lighthouses